The 2019–20 Gibraltar Intermediate League is the second season of under-23 football in Gibraltar, after reforms to reserve team football in June 2018. The league will be contested by 10 teams - nine under-23 sides plus Hound Dogs, and began on 18 August 2019.

As a result of the COVID-19 pandemic, the Gibraltar FA decided to end the season after 16 games on 13 March 2020. As Lincoln Red Imps Intermediate couldn't be caught by that point, the league title was awarded to the Red Imps.

Format
The Gibraltar Intermediate League was established by the Gibraltar Football Association in June 2018 as a merger of the pre-existing Reserves Division and Under 18 Division, in order to aid player development on the territory. Competing clubs are required to register a reserve squad of 18 players, of which 13 must be Gibraltarian.

Teams

Following the dissolution of Gibraltar Phoenix and Gibraltar United, along with St Joseph's opting not to return to the league following their withdrawal half-way through the previous season, Bruno's Magpies and College 1975 entered intermediate sides for the first time. Due to the lack of resources necessary to compete in the new Gibraltar National League, Hound Dogs were granted special permission by the Gibraltar FA to participate as a senior side in the Intermediate League.

Note: Flags indicate national team as has been defined under FIFA eligibility rules. Players may hold more than one non-FIFA nationality.

League table

Season statistics

Scoring

Top scorers

Hat-tricks

Clean Sheets

See also
2019–20 Gibraltar National League

Notes

References

Intermediate